Super Troopers is a 2001 American comedy film directed by Jay Chandrasekhar and written by and starring the Broken Lizard comedy group (Chandrasekhar, Kevin Heffernan, Steve Lemme, Paul Soter and Erik Stolhanske). Marisa Coughlan, Daniel von Bargen and Brian Cox co-star while Lynda Carter has a cameo appearance. In total, Fox Searchlight paid $3.25 million for distribution rights of the film and it grossed $23 million at the box office.

A sequel, Super Troopers 2, was released on April 20, 2018.

Plot 
In the fictional town of Spurbury, Vermont, four Vermont state troopers patrol a  section of highway and compete for prominence with the local police department. Although they are warned that their station risks being shuttered due to low productivity, the troopersLieutenant Arcot Ramathorn, "Rabbit" Roto, "Mac" Womack, and Carl Fosterdelight in playing practical jokes on unsuspecting motorists and each other, rather than enforcing the law. They particularly enjoy tormenting fellow trooper Rodney Farva, a cocky and overzealous officer who has been suspended from the road for an unspecified incident.

The troopers, led by Captain John O'Hagen, are called to investigate an abandoned Winnebago off the highway, only to find the Spurbury police have already arrived: by claiming the investigation, the Spurbury police chief, Bruce Grady, hopes to force the closure of the troopers' station, thereby securing increased funding for his agency. The animosity leads to a brawl between the assembled officers, during which the body of a murdered woman is discovered inside the Winnebago. The troopers observe a tattoo on the dead woman depicting a monkey. During a routine traffic stop of a semi truck shortly after, Foster and Womack discover a large shipment of marijuana marked with stickers depicting the same monkey. The troopers suspect the dead woman and the marijuana are related, but Chief Grady laughs off the claim and refuses Captain O'Hagen's suggestion that the troopers and local police cooperate on the investigation.

Foster begins a relationship with Spurbury police officer Ursula Hanson and, while attempting to have sex with her in the now-impounded Winnebago, discovers hidden bundles of marijuana, all bearing the same monkey sticker. Foster conspires with Ursula, who hates her coworkers and is stuck manning the front desk, to reveal the bust at an upcoming visit by the governor, thereby proving the troopers' suspicions and embarrassing the local police. Meanwhile, Farva is reinstated to patrol and partnered with an exasperated Ramathorn. However, Farva attacks a restaurant cashier and is arrested by the Spurbury police. Chief Grady offers Farva a job with his department in exchange for information about the drug investigation, but Farva refuses. Farva is subsequently reprimanded by an infuriated O'Hagen, who re-suspends Farva.

The governor arrives in Spurbury; Ramathorn and Foster break into the police impound and steal the Winnebago, planning to reveal the marijuana discovered by Foster at a press conference. They barely make it in time, only to discover the marijuana has already been seized by the Spurbury police, with Chief Grady claiming credit. Foster accuses Ursula of revealing the location of the marijuana in exchange for a favorable assignment. Having nothing to show for their efforts, the state troopers expect their station to be shut down.

Back at the station, the troopers find Farva dressed in a Spurbury police uniform; Foster realizes that it was Farva, not Ursula, who betrayed the location of the marijuana. The troopers, including Captain O'Hagen, handcuff Farva to a toilet and drunkenly vandalize Chief Grady's house.  Ursula offers to help the troopers get back at Grady, and tips them off to intercept a drug-running truck. As they attempt to pursue it, the troopers encounter an escaped Farva, who holds them at gunpoint and berates them for not taking him seriously as a cop. O'Hagen intervenes and the troopers convince Farva to help them stop the drug smugglers. Following the truck to a nearby airfield, the troopers observe it being loaded with marijuana from a Canadian-marked plane. Chief Grady and several Spurbury officers then arrive, and the troopers realize that the local police are running protection for the smugglers. After creating a diversion, the troopers brawl with the Spurbury officers and smugglers, ultimately arresting them.

Some days later, the governor sends Captain O'Hagen a letter thanking him for his efforts, but telling him the station will still be shut down. Three months later, Ramathorn and Rabbit, as deliverymen, find themselves bringing a keg of beer to a party hosted by underage college students they previously arrested. As the teenagers torment the seemingly powerless ex-troopers, they remove their deliverymen's uniforms to reveal that they are Spurbury police officers, having replaced their corrupt predecessors.

Cast 
Vermont State Troopers
 Jay Chandrasekhar as Lieutenant Arcot "Thorny" Ramathorn, a veteran of the Vermont State Police who is the second-in-command of his barracks.
 Paul Soter as Trooper Carl Foster, arguably the most calm and reserved Trooper of the force.
 Steve Lemme as Trooper MacIntyre "Mac" Womack, the Trooper who enjoys pranks the most.
 Erik Stolhanske as Trooper Robbie "Rabbit" Roto, a rookie State Trooper.
 Kevin Heffernan as Trooper Rodney "Rod" Farva, a fat, loud, ill-tempered, obnoxious and arrogant radio operator.
 Brian Cox as Captain John O'Hagen, the cantankerous commander of his Vermont State Trooper barracks.

Spurbury Police Department
 Daniel von Bargen as Police Chief Bruce Grady, the sassy chief of the Spurbury Police
 Marisa Coughlan as Officer Ursula Hanson, an underappreciated dispatcher
 James Grace as Officer Jim Rando, a rude, ill-tempered, wisecracking police officer
 Michael Weaver as Officer Samuel Smy, an obnoxious, intellectually stupid police officer
 Dan Fey as Officer Jack Burton, an obnoxious, intellectually stupid police officer

Other Characters
 Andre Vippolis as College boy 1
 Joey Kern as College boy 2
 Geoffrey Arend as College boy 3
 Amy de Lucia as Bobbi Ramathorn, Thorny's wife
 Philippe Brenninkmeyer as German man
 Maria Tornberg as German woman
 Jimmy Noonan as Frank Galikanokus, one of the ringleaders in the drug smuggling ring
 Jim Gaffigan as Larry Johnson, a speeding motorist 
 Blanchard Ryan as Casino La Fantastique Sally
 Lynda Carter as Vermont Governor Jessman
 John Bedford Lloyd as "Mad Bill" Timber, the Mayor of Spurbury
 Charlie Finn as Ted, a wisecracking yet dim-witted employee at the fictitious Dimpus Burger.
 Walt MacPherson as Foreman 1 (deleted scene)
 Jerry Walsh as Foreman 2 (deleted scene)

Production 
Broken Lizard member Steve Lemme stated that the idea for the film came from road tripping to various weddings in his friend and fellow BL member Jay Chandraskhar's car and frequently getting pulled over by cops.  As they were frequently under the influence of drugs, the gang began to wonder what would happen if the cops were aware of the situation and "had a sense of humor". Theorizing that if they did that they "could have fucked with us so much."

The opening chase scene that ended at Thin Queen Tavern, was actually The Golden Rail Ale House, located in Newburgh, New York.

The syrup chugging scene was filmed in M's Cozy Corner located in Fishkill, New York, which has since closed.

Reception

Critical response 
On Rotten Tomatoes, the film holds an approval rating of 35% based on 88 reviews, with an average rating of 5/10. The site's critical consensus reads, "A more miss-than-hit affair, Super Troopers will most likely appeal to those looking for something silly." On Metacritic, the film has a weighted average score of 48 out of 100, based on 24 critics, indicating "mixed or average reviews".

Film critic Roger Ebert awarded the film  stars out of 4, saying "I can't quite recommend it — it's too patched together — but I almost can; it's the kind of movie that makes you want to like it". A. O. Scott of The New York Times gave the film a negative review and opined that the film is "bad and tasteless".

Box office 
Overall, the film grossed $18.5 million in the United States and a total of $23.2 million worldwide. The film would eventually become a cult film with Esquire describing it as "shaggy-dog classic for Generation Y." It made $60 million from VHS, DVD and Blu-ray rentals, and as of December 2006 another $10.6 million from sales.

Soundtrack 
 "Trooper With an Attitude" - 38 Special
 "Geez Louise" - The Unband
 "Shoot First, Run Like Hell" - Nashville Pussy
 "Pass the Hatchet" - Southern Culture on the Skids
 "Big Bear" - Steak
 "Cheap Motels" - Southern Culture on the Skids
 "Cannot One Night Stand It (Anymore)" - Jack Grace Band
 "Bad Apples" - Royal Fingerbowl
 "Bidibodi Bidibu" - The Bubbles
 "Wrong Side of a Gun" - Nashville Pussy
 "The Corn Rocket" - Southern Culture on the Skids
 "King of the Mountain" - Southern Culture on the Skids
 "Worm Farm" - Jack Grace Band
 "Second to the Bottle" - Steak
 "Pink Slip" - The Unband
 "Who's the King (You Know That's Me)" - Joseph Henry

Awards 
In 2001, Super Troopers won the Audience Award at the South by Southwest Film Competition. The film tied with Lady Porn (2001) and Wave Twisters (2001).

Sequel 

A sequel was funded partly through crowdfunding site Indiegogo, and was released in April 2018 with most of the main cast returning.

Notes

References

External links 

 
 

2000s crime comedy films
2001 independent films
2001 films
American buddy comedy films
American crime comedy films
American independent films
Broken Lizard
2000s English-language films
American films about cannabis
Fox Searchlight Pictures films
Fictional quintets
Films directed by Jay Chandrasekhar
Films set in Vermont
Films about drugs
Films about pranks
American parody films
2000s police comedy films
Films about police misconduct
American slapstick comedy films
Films shot in New York (state)
2001 comedy films
2000s American films